Trollface or Troll Face is a rage comic meme image of a character wearing a mischievous smile, used to symbolise internet trolls and trolling. It is one of the oldest and most widely known rage comic faces.

History 
Trollface was drawn in Microsoft Paint on September 19, 2008, by Carlos Ramirez, an 18-year-old Oakland college student. The image was published on Ramirez's DeviantArt page, "Whynne", as part of a rage comic titled Trolls, about the pointless nature of trolling. Ramirez posted the image to the imageboard website 4chan and other users started to share it. In the following months, Ramirez's drawing quickly gained traction on 4chan as the universal emoticon of an internet troll and a versatile rage comic character. From 4chan, Trollface spread to Reddit and Urban Dictionary in 2009, eventually reaching other internet image-sharing sites like Imgur and Facebook.

In March 2021, Ramirez announced his intention to sell a non-fungible token for Trollface.

Usage 
Trollface shows a troll, someone who annoys others on the internet for their own amusement. The original comic by Ramirez mocked trolls; however, the image is widely used by trolls. Trollface has been described as the internet equivalent of the children's taunt "nyah nyah nyah nyah nyah nyah" or sticking one's tongue out. The image is often accompanied by phrases such as "Problem?" or "You mad, bro?".

Copyright 
On April 8, 2015, Kotaku ran an in-depth interview article with Ramirez about his now-iconic rage comic character. In the article, Ramirez estimated that since registering Trolls with the United States Copyright Office on July 27, 2010, he had earned more than $100,000 in licensing fees and other payouts associated with Trollface, including from licensing for shirts emblazoned with the face being sold by the retail chain Hot Topic, with monthly revenues reaching as high as $15,000 at its peak.

In addition, Ramirez also offered a backstory behind the removal of the video game Meme Run for Wii U for copyright infringement for including Trollface as the main character. Trollface is protected by copyright, but is not trademarked.

Impact 

Trollface was described by La Tercera as "the father of memes". A bust of Trollface was exhibited at the Mexico City museum Museo del Meme.

In March 2012, a viral video showed a banner emblazoned with Trollface and the word "Problem?" being used by fans of the Turkish Second League football team Eskişehirspor to protest a rule change.

In the Black Mirror episode "Shut Up and Dance", the blackmailers send Trollface photographs after they leak the victims' secrets in spite of their compliance.

In February 2021, Rebecca Black released a remix of her 2011 song "Friday" to celebrate its 10th anniversary, with the song's music video featuring several rage comic characters, including Trollface.

References 

2008 drawings
4chan phenomena
Internet memes introduced in 2008
Internet trolling
Comics characters introduced in 2008